Shaktar may refer to:

 FC Shakhtar Donetsk, a Ukrainian football club
 minister of Dhana Nanda